Christopher Bollas (born 1943) is a British psychoanalyst and writer. He is a leading figure in contemporary psychoanalytic theory.

Early life and education
Bollas was born in the United States in Washington, DC. He grew up in Laguna Beach, California, and later graduated in history from UC Berkeley in 1967. As an undergraduate Bollas studied intellectual history with Carl Schorske, and psychoanalytical anthropology with Alan Dundes. From 1967 to 1969 he trained in child counselling at the East Bay Activity Center in Oakland, California and from 1969 to 1973 he was the first graduate of the Program in Adult Psychotherapy at the University of Buffalo. At the University of Buffalo he earned a PhD in English Literature and studied with Norman Holland, Leslie Fiedler, Murray Schwartz, Michel Foucault, René Girard and with the Heideggerian psychoanalyst Heinz Lichtenstein. While at Smith College, to earn an MSW, he visited the Austen Riggs Center (where he was to become Director of Education a decade later) and met Erik Erikson who became a mentor early on in his career and was to be of singular influence for the next twenty years. He qualified in psychoanalysis at the Institute of Psychoanalysis in London in 1977 and in Adult Psychotherapy from the Tavistock Clinic in 1978. Those teachers and figures whom he knew and who helped diversify his thinking were Arnold Modell, John Bowlby, Marion Milner, André Green, Herbert Rosenfeld, Janine Chasseguet-Smirgel, Joseph J. Sandler, J.-B. Pontalis, Nina Coltart, and Paula Heimann.

Career
Bollas was a professor of English at the University of Massachusetts Amherst in the middle 1980s. Concordant with his career in literary and cultural studies, Bollas has worked as a psychotherapist since 1967. His early clinical career focused on children with autism and schizophrenica. He was the first Honorary Non Medical Consultant at the London Clinic of Psychoanalysis, visiting professor in psychoanalysis at the Istituto di Neuropsichiatria Infantile of the University of Rome from 1978 to 1998, Director of Education at the Austen Riggs Center from 1985 to 1988 and one of the literary editors of the works of D.W. Winnicott. He became a British citizen in 2010.

Contributions
Bollas is most widely known for his psychoanalytical writings and some of his ideas have had a wide dissemination; indeed, he is one of the most widely read authors in the field of psychoanalysis. His theory of "the unthought known"—that as infants we are informed by many ideas conveyed through action rather than thinking that become part of our unconscious—has been of particular significance, although other concepts "the transformational object", "violent innocence", "extractive introjection", "psychic genera and the receptive unconscious" and "human idiom" have been widely influential in the clinical field.

Free association
In the middle 1990s in Being A Character (1992) and Cracking Up (1995) Bollas turned back to Freud's early writing—especially The Interpretation of Dreams—and argued that Freud's writing implicitly assumed a theory of unconscious perception, organisation, and creativity that Bollas integrated and used in his own radical return to Freud, arguing that psychoanalysis is primarily efficacious due to entirely unconscious processes of change. In the 21st century, in Free Association, The Evocative Object World and The Infinite Question, Bollas revived Freud's marginalised theory of free association providing evidence of how and in what ways all people think associatively, revealing—as Freud argued—through the "chain of ideas", or simply how the way people move from one topic to another reveals unconscious processes of thought. In 2010 the journalist Or Ezrati, writing in the Israeli newspaper Haaretz, remarked: "Some people see Christopher Bollas as one of the two most important living theoreticians in the world of psychoanalysis".

Idiom needs
In Being a Character, Bollas also argued that everybody had their own idiom for life—a blend between the psychic organisation which from birth forms the self's core, and the implied logic of the familial way of relating into which we are then raised.

As adults, Bollas considered we spend our time looking for objects of interest—human or material—which can serve to enhance our particular idioms or styles of life—perpetually "meeting idiom needs by securing evocatively nourishing objects". Being willing to risk exposure to such transformational objects was for Bollas an essential part of a healthy life: the readiness to be metamorphosed by one's interaction with the object world.

The contrast was a refusal of development and self-invention, of open-endedness: the state of psychic stagnation. Bollas saw in what he called the anti-narcissist a willed refusal to use objects for the development of his/her own idiom, and a consequent foreclosure of the true self. The result can lead to what Adam Phillips called "the core catastrophe in many of Bollas's powerful clinical vignettes... being trapped in someone else's (usually the parents') dream or view of the world".

Bollas was however well aware of the converse danger of expecting too much from the role of the transformational object, especially as found within the transference.

In popular culture
Aside from his clinical writings, Bollas is also a cultural critic and his writings have earned the interests of people outside the world of psychoanalysis. He has also written three comic novels: Dark at the End of the Tunnel, I Have Heard the Mermaids Singing and Mayhem - and five plays.

An American television sitcom, Cracking Up, derived its title from Bollas' book of that title and included a main character, "Dr Bollas", played by Henry Gibson. Bollas is also among the psychoanalysts mentioned in the first series of HBO's In Treatment.

Bibliography

Nonfiction
 The Shadow of the Object (1987, Free Association Books: 1987 Columbia University Press) 
 Forces of Destiny (1989, Free Association Books) 
 Being a Character (1992, Routledge) 
 Cracking Up (1995, Routledge) 
 The New Informants (with David Sundelson, 1996, Jason Aronson) 
 The Mystery of Things (1999, Routledge) 
 Hysteria (1999, Routledge) 
 Free Association (2002, Ikon Books) 
 The Freudian Moment (2007, Karnac Books) 
 The Evocative Object World (2009, Routledge) 
 The Infinite Question (2009, Routledge) 
 The Christopher Bollas Reader (2011, Routledge) 
 China on the Mind (2013, Routledge) 
 Catch Them Before They Fall: Psychoanalysis of Breakdown (2013, Routledge) 
 When the Sun Bursts: The Enigma of Schizophrenia (2015, Yale University Press) 
 Meaning and Melancholia (2018, Routledge) 
Three Characters: Narcissist, Borderline, Manic Depressive (2021, Phoenix Publishing House) ISBN 978-1912691814

Fiction and plays
 Dark at the End of the Tunnel (2004 Free Association Books) 
 I Have Heard the Mermaids Singing (2005 Free Association Books) 
 Theraplay and Other Plays (2005 Free Association Books) 
 Mayhem (2005, Free Associations Books)

Works about Bollas
 The Vitality of Objects ed. Joseph Scalia (2002, Continuum) 
 The Independent Mind in British Psychoanalysis Eric Rayner, (1991, Aronson) 
 The Metapsychology of Christopher Bollas: an Introduction, Sarah Nettleton (2016, Routledge)

References

External links
 Christopher Bollas Website

1943 births
American psychoanalysts
Analysands of Masud Khan
Autism researchers
British psychoanalysts
Living people
People from Laguna Beach, California
Smith College School for Social Work alumni
UC Berkeley College of Letters and Science alumni
University of Massachusetts Amherst faculty
University at Buffalo alumni
Austen Riggs Center physicians